The Conquest of Melilla occurred on the 17th of September 1497, when a fleet sent by the Duke of Medina Sidonia occupied the north African city of Melilla.

After the fall of Granada and the disappearance of the Emirate of Granada the mediterranean coast of the Sultanate of Fez became very unsettled, often raided by barbary pirates or pirates from Cádiz. Melilla among other cities, fell in decadence in opposition to cities located in the Atlantic facade, which concentrated most of the economic activity. Also, the port, fortress and walls of Melilla had been destroyed by the disputes between the rulers of Fez and Tlemcen. The Catholic monarchs saw Melilla as a way of expanding along the African mediterranean coast to secure Aragonese, Castilian and Genoese sea trade. However, by the end of the Granada War Melilla was in the Portuguese zone of influence under the terms of the 1479 Treaty of Alcáçovas. After the 1494 Treaty of Tordesillas the crown of Castile was able to attempt the conquer of Melilla but the kings had still to end the Conquest of the Canary Islands, not to mention the economic efforts set on the voyages of Christopher Columbus. It was the prominent duke of Medina Sidonia, one of the wealthiest men in the Crown of Castile, who had also contributed with soldiers to the Battle of Aguere during Conquest of the Canary Islands, who commanded   with ships, soldiers and builders to Melilla. They arrived on 17 September 1497 and conquered the city virtually without a fight and started to rebuild the city walls and fortress. The Wattasid ruler Muhammad al-Shaykh sent a detachment of cavalrymen to retake control of the city, but they were repulsed by the guns of the Spanish ships. After the conquer of Melilla followed the cities of Cazaza and Mazalquivir (1505), Peñón de Vélez de la Gomera (1508), Oran (1509), Peñón of Algiers, Béjaïa and Tripoli (1510), Annaba, Bizerta, Tunis and La Goulette (1535) while the Portuguese set focus on the atlantic coast conquering Ceuta (1415), Tangier (1471), Mazagan (1502), Agadir (1505), Mogador (1506) y Casablanca 1515.

September 17 is Melilla Day.

See also
 Plazas de soberanía
 Conquest of the Canary Islands

Notes

Bibliography 
 
 

1497 in Spain
History of Melilla
Melilla
Melilla
Melilla